The Day of the African Child has been celebrated on June 16 every year since 1991, when it was first initiated by the OAU Organisation of African Unity. It honors those who participated in the Soweto Uprising in 1976 on that day. It also raises awareness of the continuing need for improvement of the education provided to African children.

In Soweto, South Africa, on June 16, 1976, about ten thousand black school children marched in a column more than half a mile long, protesting the poor quality of their education and demanding their right to be taught in their own language. Hundreds of young students were shot, the most famous of which being Hector Pieterson (see image). More than a hundred people were killed in the protests of the following two weeks, and more than a thousand were injured.

On June 16 every year, governments, NGOs, international organisations and other stakeholders gather to discuss the challenges and opportunities facing the full realization of the rights of children in Africa. For 2014, the theme chosen returns to the roots of the movement: A child-friendly, quality, free, and compulsory education for all children in Africa

See also 
African Charter on the Rights and Welfare of the Child
Africa Day
Children's Day November 14
International Mother Language Day

External links 
 
 BNF Youth League Commemorates Day of African Child by Arafat Khan, June 16, 2009
 June 16: International Day of the African Child by Adesoji Adegbulu, June 14, 2014

Protests
June observances